Beach volleyball at the Pacific Games has been contested since 1999 when the sport was included at the Eleventh South Pacific Games held in Guam. Since that time, Beach volleyball has been one of the core sports of the Pacific Games, required to be included for both men and women in every games. It has also been included in some of the Pacific Mini Games, starting with the seventh edition held in Palau in 2005.

Pacific Games

Men's tournament

Women's tournament

Medal table
These are the all time medal standings in Pacific Games beach volleyball for both men and women since 1999, updated to include 2019.

Pacific Mini Games

Men's

Women's

Medal tally
These are the all time medal standings in Pacific Mini Games beach volleyball for both men and women since 2005, updated to include 2017.

See also
Asian Beach Volleyball Championships
Beach volleyball at the Summer Olympics

References
 

 
Pacific Games
Pacific Games